USS Kauffman (FFG-59), an  guided missile frigate, was a ship of the United States Navy named for Vice Admiral James L. Kauffman (1887–1963) and his son, Rear Admiral Draper L. Kauffman (1911–1979), both experts in sub-surface naval missions.

Kauffman was laid down on 8 April 1985 by the Bath Iron Works, Bath, Maine; launched on 29 March 1986; sponsored by Mrs. Elizabeth Kauffman Bush, the daughter of Vice Admiral James L. Kauffman and sister of Rear Admiral Draper L. Kauffman; and commissioned on 28 February 1987 at Bath, Maine.

As of 2012, Kauffman was homeported at NS Norfolk, Virginia, and assigned to Destroyer Squadron 22.

Kauffman deployed for the final time on 8 January 2015. She was decommissioned on 18 September 2015.

History

Note: the milestones are extracted from the official command histories and no other sources. The set of command histories available is not complete, resulting in the partial record following.

1988
 6 January – 28 May: 4100 ton modifications by Bath Iron Works in Bath, Maine.
 12 August: a sailor died instantly when the Slewing Arm Davit broke from its mount and fell on him.

1989
 31 May – 10 November: Maiden deployment, Med 3–89
 4–7 August: Sevastopol, USSR port visit
 October: Sixth Fleet "Hook'em" Award for best ASW platform in Sixth Fleet AO in 1989
 13 September – 3 October: NATO exercise Display Determination-89

1990
 9 January: presented with Battle 'E'
 15 January – 15 March: ships restricted availability, #1A gas turbine engine and the Mk. 75 76mm gun mount are replaced
 8–15 June: BALTOPS-90

1991
 26 April – 26 October: deployment, MEF 2–91
 4 June – 16 September: Middle East Force (MEF) operations in the Persian Gulf

1992
 6 January – 21 February: counter narcotic operations, Caribbean Sea
 towed a vessel that had lost propulsion  to Guantanamo Bay, Cuba
 rescued the crew from the stricken  coastal freighter Ramsli just before she sank
 2 August – 23 October: Ships Restricted Availability (Drydock), by Bath Iron Works Bath, Maine
 15 September: presented with Battle 'E'

1993
 11 March – 8 September: deployed, Med 2–93
 29 April – 18 June: Operation Deny Flight in the Adriatic Sea, Operation Maritime Guard
 22 June – 17 August: Maritime Interdiction Operations enforcing United Nations sanctions against Iraq, North Red Sea
 7 November: provided assistance to the Argentine frigate ARA Granville (P-33) while in port at Roosevelt Roads Naval Station, Puerto Rico
 9 November – 6 December: counter drug operations, Caribbean Sea

1994
 13 May – 3 June: Maritime Interception Operations enforcing United Nations sanctions against Haiti
 6 June: Homeport shift from Newport, Rhode Island, to Norfolk, Virginia
 1 July – 1 August: Operation Support Democracy, Haiti with 3 US Army OH-58 Kiowa helicopters
 5–6 July: rescued 787 migrants from Haitian waters, transported to Guantanamo Bay, Cuba
 20–21 July: towed the Motor Vessel Valerie I from the south coast of Haiti to Guantanamo Bay, Cuba

1996
 24 April: completion of an extended ships restricted availability period beginning September 1995, including installation of Mod 6 to the Mk 92 Guided Missile Fire Control System
 8 July – 24 August: counter drug operations, Caribbean Sea
 20 September: Commander John A. Kunert, USN relieves Commander David F. Britt, USN
 10–31 December: Operation Carib Shield – counter drug operations, Caribbean Sea

1997
 1–17 January: Operation Carib Shield – counter drug operations, Caribbean Sea
 4 March – 24 June: ships restricted availability (drydock) by Norfolk Shipbuilding and Drydock Company

1998
 13 March – 11 September: deployed, Med (originally tasked to Middle East Force)
 12 October – 11 December: planned restricted availability

1999
 15–18 September: sortied for Hurricane Dennis

2004
 15 July – 22 September: ships restricted availability, installed Mk 53 "Nulka" Decoy Launching System (DLS)

References

External links

USS Kauffman official website

USS Kauffman @ navysite.de
USS Kauffman FFG-59 @ MaritimeQuest

1986 ships
Oliver Hazard Perry-class frigates of the United States Navy
Carrier Strike Group Two
Ships built in Bath, Maine